Ilya Vladimirovich Fomichev (also Fomichyov) (born 14 August 1982) is a Kazakhstani professional footballer who played for FC Vostok.

He also played for the Finnish club AC Oulu.

References

1982 births
Living people
Kazakhstani footballers
Association football defenders
Kazakhstani expatriate footballers
Expatriate footballers in Finland
Expatriate footballers in Uzbekistan
Kazakhstan Premier League players
Veikkausliiga players
AC Oulu players
FC Taraz players
FC Caspiy players
FC Vostok players
TP-47 players
FK Mash'al Mubarek players